The 2019–20 Buffalo Bulls women's basketball team represents the University at Buffalo during the 2019–20 NCAA Division I women's basketball season. The Bulls, led by eight-year head coach Felisha Legette-Jack, play their home games at Alumni Arena as members of the East Division of the Mid-American Conference. They finished the season 19–12, 9–9 in MAC play. Buffalo won the MAC conference tournament championship game over Ohio, 77–61. Cierra Dillard was named the tournament's Most Valuable Player. With that win they earn an automatic trip to the NCAA women's tournament where they upset Rutgers in the first round before losing to Connecticut in the second round.

Previous season 
The Bulls finished the 2018–19 season 29–6, 16–2 in MAC play to win the MAC East Division. They advanced to the championship game of the Mid-American Conference women's basketball tournament where they lost to Central Michigan. They received an at-large to the NCAA women's tournament where they upset South Florida in the first round to win their first NCAA tournament win in school history. They then defeated Florida State in the second round to advance to the Sweet Sixteen for the first time in school history, where they lost to South Carolina. With 29 wins, they finished with the most wins in school history.

Offseason

Departures

Roster

Schedule

|-
!colspan=9 style=| Exhibition

|-
!colspan=9 style=| Non-conference regular season

|-
!colspan=9 style=| MAC regular season

|-
!colspan=9 style=| MAC Women's Tournament

|-
!colspan=9 style=| NCAA Women's Tournament

Rankings
2018–19 NCAA Division I women's basketball rankings

See also
 2018–19 Buffalo Bulls men's basketball team

References

Buffalo
Buffalo Bulls women's basketball seasons
Buffalo Bulls
Buffalo Bulls